Dinard (Gallo: Dinard) is a commune in the Ille-et-Vilaine department, Brittany, northwestern France.

Dinard is on the Côte d'Émeraude of Brittany. Its beaches and mild climate make it a holiday destination, and this has resulted in the town having a variety of famous visitors and residents. The towns of Pleurtuit and Saint-Malo are nearby and the Dinard Pleurtuit Saint-Malo airport is about 4 km south of Dinard.

With its international film festival, villas, sumptuous hotels and casino, Dinard is regarded as one of the most prestigious seaside resorts in all of France.

The official name of the town was successively Saint-Énogat (until 1879), Dinard-Saint-Énogat (from 1879 to 1921) and Dinard (since 1921). Today, moreover, Saint-Énogat is still a district belonging to the city, it is close to the sea and is home to many small shops.

The city also has a football club called FCD (Football Club Dinardais), which includes categories from U6 to Senior, the club is well helped by the town hall and the city of Dinard which helps with equipment, transport, grounds, and also the organization of the club.

The city also hosts the Jumping Internationnale in show jumping every year, this competition is very important and brings back many people who come to watch the show, this competition has had 5 stars for several years now!

History 
In modern history Dinard was first settled by Saint-Malo's shipping merchants, who built some of the town's larger houses, very few of which survive. In the late 19th century, American and British aristocrats made Dinard a fashionable summer resort, and they built stunning villas on the cliff tops and exclusive hotels such as the  'Le Grand Hotel' on the seafront during the French "Belle Époque".

The name Dinard comes from the words "Din" ("hill"/"fort") and Ard/Art ("fortified"). It has been claimed, probably erroneously, that the second element means "bear"/"Arthur"); the bear in Celtic mythology is a symbol of sovereignship. The town council is in the process of removing the bear from the municipal flag, a decision disputed by the former mayor.

Originally, Dinard was part of the parish of Saint-Énogat. In the late 19th century, the resort became popular with wealthy British nationals who built villas on the coast. Dinard rapidly expanded. It started declining in the 1930s when the fashionable social set started preferring the Côte d'Azur. Today, Dinard is considered one of the most "British" of coastal resorts in France. It has, however, retained its French charm. There are 407 listed villas.

The official name of the town was Saint-Énogat until 1879 when the name was changed to Dinard-Saint-Énogat. The name was changed once more in 1921 to become simply Dinard. Saint-Énogat is now just the name for the western area of the town.

The town was liberated by American forces in August 1944 during the Battle of Saint-Malo.

Population
Inhabitants of Dinard are called Dinardais in French.

Climate 
Dinard lies on the Gulf Stream which means it enjoys a warm climate, several degrees warmer than the surrounding areas. The Yacht club has fine examples of tropical palms and plants, which stretch round the coast on the Promenade du Clair de Lune.

Hotels 

The most exclusive hotels are the Grand Hôtel Barrière (5-star) which overlooks the Rance Estuary, and Castelbrac (5-star), the former Villa "Bric à Brac". Other notable hotels are the Royal, which sits next to the Casino above the main Esplanade, and the Hotel de la Reine Hortense, with a direct view on the Ecluse beach and Saint Malo. Further round the coast in the Saint-Énogat area of Dinard is the Thalassa Dinard and Villas de La Falaise. This exclusive seawater therapy centre is one of only a few throughout Europe. The architecture of this building is sympathetic with the coastline, and from some angles becomes at one with the cliffside.

In the summer, the population swells to over 40,000 with the influx of holiday makers.

Visitors 
Dinard's reputation as the "Cannes of the North" has attracted a wide variety of stars. Joan Collins is a frequent visitor, and Winston Churchill enjoyed holidaying on the River Rance T.E. Lawrence (Lawrence of Arabia) lived in Dinard as a small child, long before his Arabian exploits, and Picasso painted here in the 1920s. Debussy is supposed to have had the idea for "La Mer" during a visit to Saint-Énogat in 1902. In 1996 Éric Rohmer filmed parts of Conte d'été in Dinard. Oscar Wilde also visited the place and mentions it in his De Profundis. Welsh singer-songwriter Iwan Rheon's first studio album is named Dinard after the commune.

The Wales national football team used Dinard as its base during UEFA Euro 2016.

Attractions 
Dinard cannot boast much nightlife, but many bars and fine restaurants fill the town's streets. The abundance of beaches coupled with a consistently sunny weather, however, attracts many visitors during the summer holidays. The attractions include a casino with a restaurant facing the sea and a hall which hosts many expositions. The nearby towns of Saint-Briac-sur-Mer and Saint-Lunaire also feature respectively a fairly large golf course and the beach of Longchamp, renowned as a "surfers' spot".

Dinard holds every year a Festival of British Cinema in the first days of October.

Founded in 1989 by Thierry de la Fournière, the British Film Festival introduces professionals and film lovers to the richness of a dynamic and original production. The British Dinard Film Festival and the British film production have experienced a parallel progression. While the number of films produced in Great Britain doubled in the early 1990s, the Festival saw its reputation and attendance grow. From the social chronicle to the crazy comedy, English cinema is of great vigour. True to its original spirit, the Dinard Festival has become an important vector for all films wishing to conquer the European market. The event also allows the many distributors present to discover films that can find a network of rooms after the festival. Many film stars are also present during this festival. This year José Garcia was part of the jury.

Educational facilities 
Many educational facilities may be found in Dinard, most of them elementary and primary schools, though there are two secondary schools.  The most popular, the Collège Le Bocage, is a state school (the other being private) and has an estimated 700 pupils from Dinard and its vicinity. From there onward, children go to lycée, the closest being the Lycée Jacques Cartier in Saint-Malo.

Beaches 
The town has several beaches, all of which are sandy, clean and large. The main beach is Plage de l'Écluse and the second largest are Saint-Énogat and Prieuré beaches.
Dinard also have other little beaches near the city center, wich offer another view of Dinard. They are all reachable by a path along the sea, called « le chemin de ronde»

International relations 
Dinard is twinned with:
  Newquay, United Kingdom (since 1986)
  Starnberg, Germany (since 1977)

Notable residents 
Captain Philippe Koenigswerther, French Resistance fighter, Chevalier de la Légion d'Honneur, executed by the Nazis, born in Dinard in 1918,
Virginia d'Albert-Lake, French Resistance fighter
Robert W. Service – Scottish poet and writer of the Klondike Gold Rush spent winter seasons in Dinard from 1913 until 1929.
Florence Delaage, classical pianist, was born in Dinard.

Gallery

See also 
Communes of the Ille-et-Vilaine department
Jean-Marie Valentin

References

External links 

Official website 
Dinard's homepage 
Amis de Dinard Saint-Enogat, association for the protection of the site and of the environment of Dinard 
Unofficial Guide to the Dinard Airport 

Communes of Ille-et-Vilaine
Port cities and towns on the French Atlantic coast
Seaside resorts in France